Trance and Dance (Dindisc LP, VL 2207) was Martha and the Muffins' 1980 second album, and like the previous Metro Music was produced by Mike Howlett. The album included "Motorbikin’", the band's cover of Chris Spedding's 1976 UK hit.

Initial editions were released with a bonus 4 track EP of live recordings.

Part of Trance And Dance was later released (along with Metro Music in its entirety and two tracks from the later This is the Ice Age album) on the 1987 semi-compilation Far Away in Time.

A freshly remastered and expanded edition of Trance And Dance was issued on CD in 2013 by Cherry Red Records (CDMRED 584) in the UK. This edition includes the complete original album, the original bonus 4 track EP of live recordings, along with two b-sides: "Girl Fat" which had appeared on the "Suburban Dream" single, and "1 4 6" which is taken from the "About Insomnia" single. All tracks were remastered in Toronto by Peter J. Moore under the band's supervision. A 15-page colour booklet features song lyrics, photos of the band and of various album-related artifacts, the band's complete UK discography, and new liner notes written by founding and current band member, Mark Gane.

Track listing

Personnel
Carl Finkle - Bass
Mark Gane - Guitars, Vocals, Synthetics
Tim Gane - Drums, percussion
Martha Johnson - Vocals, Keyboards
Martha Ladly - Vocals, Keyboards, Trombone
Andy Haas - Saxophone
David Millar - Live sound

Production credits
Produced by Mike Howlett
Engineered by Richard Manwaring
Tape op. - Howard Gray
Cover concept - Martha and the Muffins
Cover painting - Martha Ladly
Art Direction - Peter Saville
2013 Remastered & Expanded Edition: Remastering - Peter J. Moore

References

1980 albums
Martha and the Muffins albums
Albums produced by Mike Howlett
Virgin Records albums